Seaquest is an Atari 2600 video game designed by Steve Cartwright and published by Activision in 1983. The game is an underwater shooter in which the player controls a submarine.

Gameplay

The player uses a submarine to shoot at enemies and rescue divers. Enemies include sharks and submarines, which shoot missiles at the player's submarine . The player must ward off the enemies by firing an unlimited supply of missiles while trying to rescue divers swimming through the water. The points awarded to the player for shooting an enemy starts at 10 points each, and increases as the game advances. The sub can hold up to six divers at a time. Each time the player resurfaces prior to having a full load of six divers, one of the divers is removed.

The submarine has a limited amount of oxygen. The player must surface often in order to replenish the oxygen, but if the player resurfaces without any rescued divers, they will lose a life. If the player resurfaces with the maximum amount of divers, they will gain bonus points for the sub's remaining oxygen. Each time the player surfaces, the game's difficulty increases; enemies increase in number and speed. Eventually an enemy sub begins patrolling the surface, leaving the player without a safe haven.

The player starts the game with 3 extra lives, and is awarded an additional extra life each time the player scores 10,000 points.

Seaquest can be played single-player or with two players alternating turns.

Reception
Retro Gamer's Darran Jones wrote that the Atari and Activision titles of the Atari 2600 era featured fantastic box art on their covers and that the Seaquest title was one of the few to live up its cover saying "a shoot-'em-up at heart, it's developer, Steve Cartwright, mixed things up by giving you divers to rescue and a strict air supply to manage."

See also

List of Atari 2600 games
List of Activision games: 1980–1999

References

External links
Seaquest at Atari Mania
.

1983 video games
Action video games
Activision games
Atari 2600 games
North America-exclusive video games
Video games designed by Steve Cartwright
Video games with underwater settings
Video games developed in the United States